The second USS Hiawatha (ID-2892 or SP-2892) was a harbor tug that served in the United States Navy in 1918.

Hiawatha was built as a civilian, wooden-hulled steam tug of the same name in 1903 by Brown at Tottenville, Staten Island, New York. The U.S. Navy acquired her under charter from her owner for World War I service on 1 August 1918. She was commissioned as USS Hiawatha (ID-2892 or SP-2892) at New York City the same day.

Assigned to the 3rd Naval District, Hiawatha operated with the guard ship USS Amphitrite and was manned either by sailors from Amphitrite or by a civilian crew. She performed guard duty in the New York Harbor and boarded ships to inspect cargo until she was decommissioned on 5 December 1918.

Hiawatha was returned to her owner on either 30 April 1919 or 5 May 1919.

Throughout her U.S. Navy service, Hiawatha was one of two ships simultaneously in service as USS Hiawatha, the other being the patrol vessel USS Hiawatha (SP-183).

Notes

References

Department of the Navy: Naval Historical Center: Online Library of Selected Images: Civilian Ships: Tug Hiawatha (1903); Later USS Hiawatha (ID # 2892), 1918-1919
NavSource Online: Section Patrol Craft Photo Archive Hiawatha (ID 2892)

Tugs of the United States Navy
World War I auxiliary ships of the United States
Ships built in Staten Island
1903 ships